Blatte